Thijmen Kupers (born 4 October 1991) is a Dutch middle-distance runner who specialises in the 800 metres.

Raised in Lengel, Gelderland, he participated in football and long-distance running as a child. He gradually became more interested in running and signed up with Running Team Achterhoek, a local group. He competed in national junior competitions and began to train regularly around 2008. He placed in the top three in the Dutch junior 800 m race in 2009 and 2010.

Kupers began to make an impact nationally in 2012. He set a personal best of 1:48.71 minutes to win the indoor Dutch title, then set a best of 1:46.46 minutes at the FBK Games, which ranked him second among Dutch athletes behind Robert Lathouwers. He was selected for the 2012 European Athletics Championships and made the semi-finals at the competition – his first senior international event. He defended his national indoor title in 2013 and went on to run in the semi-finals at the 2013 European Athletics Indoor Championships. Outdoors, he came fifth at the European Team Championships first league race, then sixth at the 2013 European Athletics U23 Championships, where he was also seventh in the 4×400 metres relay. He won his first Dutch outdoor title in Amsterdam that season.

Kupers won a third straight indoor title at the start of 2014 and went on to record a best of 1:46.55 minutes at the 2014 IAAF World Indoor Championships, where he came fifth in the final.

Personal bests
800 metres outdoor – 1:44:99 min (2017)
800 metres indoor – 1:46.21 min (2016)

Competition record

1 Din not start in the semifinals
National titles
800 metres indoor: 2012, 2013, 2014
800 metres outdoor: 2013

References

External links

Official website



1991 births
Living people
Dutch male middle-distance runners
People from Montferland
Sportspeople from Gelderland
World Athletics Championships athletes for the Netherlands
21st-century Dutch people